Kenneth Irwin Kellermann (born July 1, 1937) is an American astronomer at the National Radio Astronomy Observatory. He is best known for his work on quasars. He won the Helen B. Warner Prize for Astronomy of the American Astronomical Society in 1971, and the Bruce Medal of the Astronomical Society of the Pacific in 2014.

Kellerman was a member of the National Academy of Sciences, the American Academy of Arts and Sciences, and the American Philosophical Society.

Kellermann was born in New York City to Alexander Kellermann and Rae Kellermann (née Goodstein). His paternal grandparents emigrated from Hungary and his maternal grandparents from Romania.

Publications

 Direct Link

References

Living people
1937 births
Members of the Eurasian Astronomical Society
Foreign Members of the Russian Academy of Sciences
Scientists from New York City
Jewish American scientists
American people of Hungarian-Jewish descent
American people of Romanian-Jewish descent
21st-century American Jews

Members of the American Philosophical Society